Sergio López may refer to:

Sergio Augusto López Ramírez (born 1961), Mexican politician
Sergio López (sprinter) (born 1968), Spanish Olympic sprinter
Sergio López (sprinter, 1999) (born 1999), Spanish sprinter
Sergio López Miró (born 1968), Spanish swimmer
Sergio López (footballer, born 1989), Argentine football midfielder for Barcelona SC
Sergio López (footballer, born 1999), German football right-back for FC Basel

See also
Sergi López (disambiguation)

López, the surname
Sergio (given name), the given name